Eleven ships of the Royal Navy have been named HMS Antelope, after the Antelope:

  was a galleass carrying between 38 and 44 guns. She was launched in 1546, rebuilt three times and was burned by parliamentarian sailors at Hellevoetsluis in 1649.
  was a 56-gun third-rate great frigate launched in 1651 and wrecked in 1652.
 was a 40-gun fourth-rate frigate launched in 1653 as Preston and renamed in 1660. She was sold in 1693.
 was a 54-gun fourth rate launched in 1703. She was rebuilt in 1741 and was sold in 1783.
 was a 14-gun sloop purchased in 1784, and lost in a hurricane later that year.
 was a 50-gun fourth rate launched in 1802. She was used as a troopship from 1818, was placed on harbour service from 1824 and was broken up in 1845.
She was later renamed to Antelope, and was broken up in 1814.
 was an  iron paddle sloop launched in 1846 and sold in 1883.
 was an  launched in 1893. She was used for harbour service from 1910 and was sold in 1919.
 was an  destroyer launched in 1929 and sold in 1946.
 was a Type 21 frigate launched in 1972 and bombed and sunk in the Falklands War in 1982.

Battle honours
Ships named Antelope have earned the following battle honours:
Armada, 1588
Lowestoft, 1665
Four Days' Battle, 1666
Orfordness, 1666
Sole Bay, 1672
Marbella, 1705
Aquilon, 1757
Atlantic, 1939−44
Bismarck, 1941
Malta Convoys, 1942
North Africa, 1942−43
Falkland Islands, 1982

See also
  was a 6-gun West Indian Post Office Packet Service packet ship that was captured in 1781, 1782, and 1794.
 , a brig of 199 tons (bm), and 12-14 guns, was launched at Bombay Dockyard in 1793 for the Bombay Marine, the British East India Company's naval arm. She was sold after 1830.
 Antelope is a fictitious 18th century privateer in Stan Rogers's song Barrett's Privateers

References

Royal Navy ship names